Enneapterygius sheni is a species of triplefin blenny in the genus Enneapterygius. It was described by Chiang Min-Chia and Chen I-Shiung in 2008. The specific name honours the ichthyologist  Shieh-Chieh Shen of the National Taiwan University. This species has only been recorded from the southern tip of Taiwan.

References

sheni
Taxa named by Chiang Min-Chia
Taxa named by Chen I-Shiung
Fish described in 2008